The population within Regina, Saskatchewan's metropolitan area was 236,481 as of 2016 Canada Census with an annual growth rate of 2.4%.

Summary

Age structure
0–14 years: 20%  
15–64 years: 67.5%  
65 years and over: 12.5%

Ethnicity

City of Regina 

Note: Totals greater than 100% due to multiple origin responses.

Metro Regina 

Note: Totals greater than 100% due to multiple origin responses.

Language

Metro Regina 
The question on knowledge of languages allows for multiple responses. The following figures are from the 2021 Canadian Census, and lists languages that were selected by at least 500 respondents.

Religion 

Protestant: 41.5%
Roman Catholic: 32.3% 
No religion: 19.0%
Eastern Orthodox: 1.8%
Other Christian: 2.9%
Other religion: 2.5%

Notes

References 

Regina, Saskatchewan